El extraño retorno de Diana Salazar (English title: The Strange Return of Diana Salazar) is a Mexican telenovela produced by Carlos Téllez for Televisa in 1988. It is an unusual example of a telenovela which addresses supernatural topics. The telenovela first begins in Zacatecas, New Spain in 1640 and later transitions to Mexico City in 1988, in which a woman accused of witchcraft and burned by the Holy Inquisition, reincarnates into a young girl who seeks to find the reason for her constant nightmare of being burned at the stake.

Starring Lucía Méndez, Jorge Martínez, Alejandro Camacho and Alma Muriel.

The telenovela was retransmitted from January 27, 2020 through May 29, 2020 on Tlnovelas. As of December 29, 2020, the series is available to stream on Blim TV.

Plot
In 1640, in the city of Zacatecas, in New Spain, the young and beautiful aristocrat Leonor de Santiago (Lucía Méndez) celebrated her marriage proposal to Don Eduardo Carbajal (Jorge Martínez). Her joy is overshadowed by a fear: Leonor possesses strange psychic powers, such as telekinesis and premonitions. Leonor begins to have strange dreams and premonitions in which she sees a dark future in her relationship with Eduardo.

Leonor and Eduardo are stalked by Lucrecia Treviño (Alma Muriel), a mysterious woman who feels a sickly love for Eduardo. Desperate, Lucrecia sets out to destroy the happiness between Leonor and Eduardo. Lucrecia discovers the mysterious powers attributed to Leonor, and with the help of her faithful servant Casilda (Ella Laboriel), decides to resort to witchcraft, making spells to separate the couple.

The night that Leonor and Eduardo celebrate their engagement party, Lucrecia breaks into Leonor's residence and accuses her of practicing witchcraft in front of one of the main authorities of the Holy Office of the Inquisition that was among the guests at the celebration. Eduardo defends Leonor, who experiences a nervous breakdown and uses her telekinetic powers in front of everyone, putting herself in evidence. Both Leonor and Eduardo are accused of practicing witchcraft and the dark arts. Both are prosecuted by the inquisitor court and sentenced to die by being burned at the stake. Upon learning that her accusation condemned Eduardo, Lucrecia commits suicide by hanging from a tree. Before dying, Leonor and Eduardo make a pact of love promising to meet in another life.

The story then shifts more than three centuries later, to Mexico City in 1988. There lives Diana Salazar (Lucía Méndez), a young middle class girl who lives with her mother, Delfina (Adriana Roel) and her older sister, Malena (Rosa María Bianchi). Diana's life is not simple. Since she was a child, she has manifested mysterious gifts that grant her extraordinary abilities. Diana possesses telekinetic abilities and premonitory powers. This situation makes her live tormented. Her father died in an accident long ago and Diana had visions about his death. Because of this, Delfina makes Diana feel responsible for the death of her father, in addition to making her believe that her powers are a curse.

Diana begins to have mysterious dreams, which are nothing more than visions of the tragic death of Leonor and Eduardo three centuries ago. Confused and tormented by these dreams, which become more disturbing every day, Diana consults Irene del Conde (Alma Muriel), a renowned psychiatrist. Irene has a romantic relationship with Omar Santelmo (Alejandro Camacho), a recognized physician in parapsychology studies. Omar is the nephew of Ernesto Santelmo (Rafael Baledón), the owner and CEO of Santelmo Digital, one of the leading computing companies in Latin America. Ernesto is a widower and had no children. Although Omar hates his uncle, he hopes to become his heir.

Ernesto Santelmo hires Mario Villarreal (Jorge Martínez), a prestigious Argentine computer engineer. Mario has an interesting project in mind: a minicomputer. Ernesto Santelmo and his company plan to support Mario's project, which they hope will be a huge success. Omar and Irene decide to discover all the secrets behind Ernesto and Mario's project and for their perverse purposes they decide to use Diana, whose mental powers will help them stay one step ahead.

Diana discovers a photograph of Mario in a newspaper and recognizes him as the man she sees in her dreams (Eduardo). Meanwhile, to please his nephew, Ernesto decides to open a clinic for parapsychological studies that will be administered by Omar. With Irene's help, Omar begins to treat Diana and soon begins to seduce her in order to have her under his control.

Irene makes a trip to Zacatecas. On her way back to Mexico City, suffers a serious motor vehicle accident. While Irene is unconscious, she has a series of dreams and revelations. When she wakes up, Irene discovers the truth: she is the reincarnation of Lucrecia Treviño. She also discovers that Diana and Mario are the reincarnation of Leonor and Eduardo. Irene discovers that her true purpose is to separate them again, destroy Diana and have Mario's love at any cost. With the help of Jordana (Patricia Reyes Spíndola), a mysterious woman she met in her convalescence, Irene begins to orchestrate a series of intrigues to fulfill her evil purpose.

Mario finds an old portrait of Leonor de Santiago and falls in love with her, as if he had always known her. Diana and Mario finally meet and fall in love immediately. From then on, both have to circumvent a series of intrigues that prevent them from being together. Its main threat is Irene. Diana will also have to discover her true identity, learn to use and master her powers, and prevent her love for Mario from being interrupted again.

Cast
 Lucía Méndez as Diana Salazar / Doña Leonor de Santiago
 Jorge Martinez as Mario Villareal / Don Eduardo Carbajal
 Alejandro Camacho as Dr. Omar Santelmo
 Alma Muriel as Dr. Irene del Conde / Lucrecia Treviño
 Adriana Roel as Delfina García de Salazar
 Ariadne Welter as Gloria Morrison / Gloria Escandón
 Patricia Reyes Spíndola as Jordana Hernández
 Carlos Cámara as Luther Henrich / Franz Webber
 Chela Nájera as Fidelia "Nela" Velasco
 Fernando Sáenz as Rodrigo Enríquez
 Rosa María Bianchi as Malena Salazar 
 Mario Casillas as Gonzalo Obregón
 Rafael Velasco as Enrique Falcón
 Alejandro Tommasi as Adrián Alfaro
 Lolita Cortés as Elizabeth 'Liz' Morrison / Elizabeth 'Liz' Escandón
 Rebeca Manríquez as Marisela Rocha
 Alejandra Peniche as Mónica Uzeta
 Beatriz Martínez as Clara 'Clarita'
 Julio Aldama as Tobías
 Ricardo Lizama as Ignacio Galván
 Carlos Magaña as Teniente Juan Manuel Amezcua
 Alonso Echánove as Rafael Romero
 Arturo Beristain as Dr. Ronaldo de Juan
 Rafael Baledon as Ing. Ernesto Santelmo
 Rosa Furman as Madame Morett
 Enrique Hidalgo as Dr. Víctor Fortes
 César Arias as Dr. Agustín Tamayo
 Yula Pozo as Teresa
 Anaís de Melo as Yoko
 Lourdes Canale as Emma
 Clementina Gaudi as Irma
 Ramón Menéndez as Jaime Ortiz Lajous
 Jorge Pais as Don Manuel Leal
 Héctor Pons as Eugenio
 Tara Parra as Doña Constanza de Santiago
 José Luis Carol as Don Álvaro de Santiago
 Ella Laboriel as Casilda
 Mario Sauret as Rodrigo Cervantes de Benavente
 Eduardo Borja as Reverendo Williams

Awards and nominations

References

External links
 

1988 telenovelas
Mexican horror fiction television series
Mexican telenovelas
1988 Mexican television series debuts
1989 Mexican television series endings
Spanish-language telenovelas
Television shows set in Mexico
Televisa telenovelas
Television shows about reincarnation
Witchcraft in television
Supernatural television series
Murder in television
Suicide in television
Television series set in the 17th century